The Josiah Woodhull House is a historic building. Built circa 1720 by the son of Richard Woodhull, the founder of Brookhaven Town.  Located on the border of East Shoreham and Wading River, it is the oldest standing building in the area.

References

External links 

 Josiah Woodhull
 Brookheaven Town historic Sites

Houses on the National Register of Historic Places in New York (state)
Houses completed in 1720
Houses in Suffolk County, New York
National Register of Historic Places in Suffolk County, New York
1720 establishments in the Province of New York